Kurt Johan van Heerden (born 19 February 1970), better known as Kurt Darren, is a South African singer, songwriter and television presenter, who won seven South African Music Awards (SAMA) from 2007 to 2011. He has also appeared in a number of South African films.

His debut was with the album For Your Precious Love released in 1995. From 2006 to 2011, Darren was the presenter of the popular South African show Jukebox broadcast on kykNET. During the programme, callers would have the opportunity to request and dedicate music videos of their choice. SMS (text) messages would also roll in during the program. The program was broadcast live on various radio stations as well on Sunday evenings.

Popularity in Europe
Many of Kurt Darren's songs in Afrikaans  are known in Europe through cover versions particularly by artists in the Netherlands and Belgium, and to some extent in Germany and Austria. Songs covered in Dutch include "Staan Op", covered by Jan Smit as "Sta Op", "Meisie Meisie" by Henk Wijngaard as "Meissie Meissie", "Kaptein Span die Seile" as "Kap'tein" by Bart Kaëll, "Hemel op Tafelberg" as "Die Zomer Gaat Nooit Voorbij" by Wim Soutaer, "Af en af" by Helemaal Hollands and "Bloubergstrand se sonsak" as "Dromendans" by Vinzzent, while Klostertaler covered "Meisie Meisie" in German and Mickie Krause covered "Kaptein Span die Seile" in German as "Chantal".

Personal life
In 2009 Kurt Darren set a new record for "bokdrol vêr spoeg" a traditional South African sport at church carnivals.

Darren married South African model Dunay Nortjé on 8 January 2011. They have a daughter, Kyrah, and a son, Kade.

On 7 July 2013, Darren suffered serious injuries as a result of a car accident on his way home after watching a rugby match. His agent Marnus Bisschoff and his secretary were also seriously injured. All were airlifted urgently to hospital, where tests showed Darren had 11 broken ribs and serious injuries to his head. He was released after weeks of treatment. Many of his scheduled concerts had to be canceled. He returned to active life months later with a rescheduled gig dates and a tour in US and Europe beginning in 2014.

Discography

CDs
1995: For Your Precious Love 
1997: Just When I Needed You Most 
1998: Kurt Darren 
2000: Since I Found You 
2001: Net Jy Alleen 
2002: Meisie Meisie 
2003: Sê Net Ja 
2004: Staan Op 
2005: Vat my, maak my joune 
2006: Lekker Lekker 
2007: Voorwaarts Mars 
2008: 30 Goue Sokkietreffers 
2008: Uit die diepte van my hart 
2009: Smiling Back At Me 
2009: Die Beste Medisyne 
2010: Met Liefde/With Love 
2010: Oos-Wes Tuis Bes (Deluxe edition) 
2011: Kurt Kaptein se platinum treffers 
2012: In jou oë
2014: Seerower
2015: Lied Vir Die Vrou
2016: Sal Jy Met My Dans?
2017: Laat Die Dansvloer Brand
2019: #Partytjiedier

Singles / Videography
(Selective)
in Afrikaans
"Meisie Meisie"
"Staan Op"
"Kom ons Dans In Afrikaans"
"Kaptein"
"Af en af"
"Lekker Lekke" (2007)
"Voorwaarts Mars" (2008)
"Hemel op Tafelberg" (2009)
"Daar Doer in die Donker" (2008)
"Loslappie" (2009)
"Bloubergstrand se sonsak" (2010)
"Lekkerbekkie" (2011)
"Heidi" (2012)
"Stoomtrein" (feat. Snotkop) (2012) 
"Kom bietjie hier" (2012) 
"Cowboys en crooks" (2014)
"Dans op die Tafel (2014)
"Ek wens vir jou" (2015)
"Kaalvoet sokkie" (2016)
"Jy's 'n Legend' (2017)
"Selfie Song" (with Leah & Snotkop) (2017)

in Dutch
"Voor Altijd" (2013)

in English
"You"
"Standing On The Edge"
"Sunday"
featured in
"Shame and Scandals" (Dr. Victor & The Rasta Rebels feat. Kurt Darren) (2012)

DVDs
2005: Op Toer 
2008: Treffers Live 
2008: Die video's

Filmography
2010: Liefling
2010: Susanna van Biljon 
2010: The Race-ist
2011: Ek lief jou
2015: Stone Cold Jane Austen
2017: Van Der Merwe

See also
List of Afrikaans singers

References

External links
Kurt Darren Official website
Kurt Darren Facebook
Kurt Darren / Select YouTube

20th-century South African male singers
21st-century South African male singers
South African songwriters
1970 births
Living people